Sacred grove or similar may mean:
sacred grove or sacred woods, a grove of trees of special religious importance to a particular culture. 
"Grove" or "Sacred grove" means an Asherah pole, a cult image, in some translations of the Bible
 Sacred Grove (Latter Day Saints), a historical site of The Church of Jesus Christ of Latter-day Saints in Ontario County, New York
 The Sacred Grove, (Arabic: al-Mash'ar al-Haram), Hajj prayer site and roofless mosque in Muzdalifah
 The Sacred Grove, (Italian: Sacro Bosco), in the Gardens of Bomarzo, renaissance garden, Lazio, Italy
 The Sacred Grove, burial ground of the Temple of Vesta
 Sacred grove at the Temple of Zeus, Olympia
 Sacred grove at Dodona, Athens
 Sacred grove of the Oracle at Delphi
 The Sacred Grove, grave site in Steuben Memorial State Historic Site, Oneida County, New York
 The Sacred Grove, Beloved of the Arts and Muses (French: le Bois Sacré), original name for the frieze The Allegory of the Sorbonne by Puvis de Chavannes
 The Sacred Grove, name given by artist John La Farge to an oak-hickory forest at Paradise, Rhode Island; after the sacred grove of Virgil
 The Sacred Grove, wooded area now occupied by the Stevenson Center of Vanderbilt University
 The Sacred Grove: Essays on Museums by Dillon Ripley, 1969
 A location in The Legend of Zelda: Twilight Princess with a folk house theme

See also
Sacred tree
Sacred wood (disambiguation)
Sacred natural site